A wedding ring is a metal ring indicating the wearer is married.

Wedding ring may also refer to:

 Wedding ring cushion, a small pillow on which the wedding rings are carried
 The Wedding Ring, a novel by Hannah Maria Jones
 "Wedding Ring" (song), a 1965 song by Australian band The Easybeats
 Wedding Ring (TV series), a Russian television series

Film
 Wedding Rings (film), 1929 American film directed by William Beaudine 
 The Wedding Ring (1944 film), Czech film directed by Martin Frič
 Wedding Ring (film), 1950 Japanese film directed by Keisuke Kinoshita
 The Wedding Ring (1971 film), French film directed by Christian de Chalonge
 The Wedding Ring (2016 film), Nigerian film